Rick Ripley was a Republican member of the Montana Legislature. He was elected to Senate District 9, representing Wolf Creek, Montana, in 2009 and 2011. In 2013 and 2015, he represented District 10. He previously served 4 terms in the House of Representatives.

References

Living people
Year of birth missing (living people)
Republican Party Montana state senators
Republican Party members of the Montana House of Representatives
21st-century American politicians